St Peter's Court was a prep school for boys at Broadstairs in Kent, U.K. In 1969 it merged with the nearby Wellesley House School and its site was redeveloped for housing.

History
The school was established during the 19th century and came to prominence in the early 20th century when it was chosen by the Prince of Wales (later King George V) for his younger sons. During the Second World War it was evacuated to Shobrooke House, near Crediton in Devon, and its head master, F. G. Ridgeway, predicted that after the war many preparatory schools would not survive much longer. In the event, the move to Devon had one alarming result. At 4 a.m. on 23 January 1945, while occupied by some seventy St Peter's schoolboys and staff, Shobrooke House caught fire and was almost completely destroyed, with the death of two of the boys.

After the end of the war the school returned to Broadstairs and was able to continue for many more years. In 1954 it had two joint head masters, the Rev. F. G. Ridgeway and C. C. Ridgeway, M.A., the number of boys was stated as 70 to 80, and there were ten teaching staff ("seven resident masters and three ladies"). In 1969 the school merged with another Broadstairs prep school, Wellesley House.

The school had its own Eton Fives court, and many of its boys were prepared for Eton. The writer Simon Raven later recalled that "St Peter's Court was once a very smart private school, much patronised by the Royal family."

In October 2019, Wellesley House celebrated the 50th anniversary of its amalgamation with St Peter’s Court.

Former pupils
Those educated at St Peter's Court include:

 Prince Henry, Duke of Gloucester (1900–1974)
 Prince George, Duke of Kent (1902–1942)
 George Jellicoe, 2nd Earl Jellicoe (1918–2007)
 Admiral of the Fleet Sir Henry Leach (1923–2011)
 Edward Douglas-Scott-Montagu, 3rd Baron Montagu of Beaulieu (1926–2015)
 Robin Leigh-Pemberton, Baron Kingsdown (1927–2013), Governor of the Bank of England
 Neil Sclater-Booth, 5th Baron Basing (1939–2007), financier
Sir Peter de la Billiere (born 1934), Commander-in-Chief of British Forces in the Gulf War

Notes

Boarding schools in Kent
Broadstairs
Defunct schools in Kent